Chasia is a mountain in northern Greece.

Chasia may also refer to the following places in Greece:
 Chasia, Grevena, a municipal unit in the Grevena regional unit
 Chasia, Trikala, a municipal unit in the Trikala regional unit